Second-seeded Maria Bueno defeated Nancy Richey 6–3, 6–1 in the final to win the women's singles tennis title at the 1966 U.S. National Championships.

Seeds
The seeded players are listed below. Maria Bueno is the champion; others show in brackets the round in which they were eliminated.

  Billie Jean King (second round)
  Maria Bueno (champion)
  Nancy Richey (finalist)
  Françoise Dürr (quarterfinals)
  Rosemary Casals (semifinals)
  Norma Baylon (quarterfinals)
  Virginia Wade (quarterfinals)
  Donna Fales (first round)

Draw

Key
 Q = Qualifier
 WC = Wild card
 LL = Lucky loser
 r = Retired

Final eight

Earlier rounds

Section 1

References

1966
1966 in women's tennis
1966 in American women's sports
Wom